Devi is a 2016 Indian comedy horror film co-written and directed by Vijay. It features Tamannaah in the titular role with Prabhu Deva and Sonu Sood in the lead roles Whilst RJ Balaji, Saptagiri, Rajiv Thakur and Murali Sharma in supporting roles. In addition to Tamil, the film was also simultaneously shot in Telugu and Hindi titled  Abhinetri and Tutak Tutak Tutiya, respectively.

All three versions were released worldwide on 7 October 2016.

Plot 
Krishna (Prabhu Deva) is a happy-go-lucky Tamilian (Teluguite in Telugu version) who works in Mumbai. He is originally from Coimbatore (Rajahmundry in Telugu version). He spends his time searching for his dream girl. He wants his life partner to be educated and have supermodel looks. He does not want a country girl for a wife. His grandmother is on her deathbed, and his father (Joy Mathew) wants him to get married. His father, with the aid of his grandmother, chooses a girl from their village. He tries many times to stop the marriage, but nothing works. He marries the girl, Devi (Tamannaah), unwillingly. He tries to get rid of her and shifts to a new house to hide her from his friends.

After moving to the new house, Devi's personality changes, which surprises Krishna. He unwillingly takes her to a film festival where, to his shock, she dances and calls herself Ruby. She attracts the attention of actor Raj Khanna (Sonu Sood). Krishna inquires about the house with his neighbours and, to his disbelief, learns about the past owner, a girl called Ruby, an actress who was supposed to debut with Raj was replaced by another actress, which caused her to fall into depression and commit suicide in that very house. He finds out that his wife is possessed by Ruby. Ruby gets an acting offer for the third sequel of Revolver Raja with Raj, and she forces Krishna to let her attend every rehearsal. Eventually, Krishna makes a deal with her to end this after one movie. Through the film making process which involves Krishna lying to Devi, Krishna begins to appreciate his wife and falls in love with her. Ruby and Krishna also become close friends.

At the release of the movie, Krishna praises Ruby for her acting, but she betrays him and does not leave Devi's body as promised. Krishna tries to make her leave by exposing her in the press conference, but she tricks him. At that point, Raj also proposes to her. She faints and is rushed to the hospital. The doctor reveals that Devi is pregnant with Krishna's child. Krishna begs Ruby to leave his wife's body, and Ruby obeys. The movie ends with Krishna and Devi happy together, while we see Ruby's name on a name tag in a trash bin disappear.

In the Tamil and Telugu versions, after a few years, Krishna and Devi live happily and have a child by the time. Krishna goes out to work, but he is possessed by Ruby, whose name tag is back again. This scene sets the stage for the sequel.

In the Hindi version, Raj is swarmed by his fans asking for an autograph, and in the midst of all, he recognizes a hand stretched out, asking for his autograph. He asked for her name, and she answers, "Ruby" (Esha Gupta). It is understood that Ruby has possessed her body.

Cast 

Guest appearances (Hindi version)
Shah Rukh Khan as voiceover in trailer
Esha Gupta as Ruby (cameo appearance)

Production
Devi was simultaneously filmed in Telugu as Abhinetri and in Hindi as Tutak Tutak Tutiya, respectively with a slightly different supporting cast for each version.

Soundtrack

Tamil version

Telugu version

Hindi version

Reception

Abhinetri 
A critic from The Hindu opined that "Except for the 'Tutak Tutak Tutiya' number where the lyrics seem more Hindi than Telugu, the makers ensure that Abhinetri remains a Telugu film at heart". 123 Telugu gave the film a rating of three out of five and said that "Abhinetri is a very simple tale that keeps you occupied (if not entertained) for its two hours duration. if you ignore the few gltiches here and there, it is a movie that can be watched once". Idlebrain gave the film the same rating and noted that "Abhinetri is one such kind of film that works based on its content, not just because of the thrills and fear factor".

Devi
M. Suganth of The Times of India gave the film a rating of three-and-a-half out of five stars and said that "Vijay gives us a story that is quite simple and at the same time empathetic". Behindwoods gave the film the same rating and said that "A wholesome ghost story that engages and entertains". Sify called the film "engaging" while criticizing the film's Hindi-dubbed feel and Bollywoodesque songs. The Hindu said that "Devi works as an engaging horror film, save for the overdose of dance and frolic that takes away the thrills" and added that "Devi is A.L. Vijay's way of saying he can do pei-sa vasool entertainers too".

Tutak Tutak Tutiya
Hindustan Times gave a rating of two out of five stars and opined that "If you are looking for an entertaining, paisa-vasool movie, Tutak Tutak Tutiya should be your pick". The Times of India gave the film a rating of three out of five stars and wrote that "Despite being a tad underwhelming, Tutak Tutak Tutiya is a fairly enjoyable film that can be watched on a family outing". The India Express gave 9he film a rating of a half out of five stars and stated that "What happens when Prabhu Deva is not given enough dance numbers but is expected to act and Tamannah Bhatia is turned into a sari-clad frump? Horror!"

Awards and nominations

Sequel
After the success of Devi and Abhinetri, the makers planned to make a sequel, titled Devi 2 and Abhinetry 2. The film's shooting commenced in Mauritius with Tamannaah, Prabhu Deva, RJ Balaji, and Saptagiri reprising their roles.

References

External links 

2016 films
2010s Tamil-language films
2010s Telugu-language films
2010s Hindi-language films
Indian multilingual films
Films directed by A. L. Vijay
Films scored by G. V. Prakash Kumar
Films scored by Sajid–Wajid
Films scored by Gopi Sundar
Indian comedy horror films
2016 multilingual films
2016 comedy horror films